Warne Rippon (born 31 August 1966) is a South African cricketer. He played in thirteen first-class and six List A matches between 1985 and 1995. In February 2020, he was named in South Africa's squad for the Over-50s Cricket World Cup in South Africa. However, the tournament was cancelled during the third round of matches due to the COVID-19 pandemic.

References

External links
 

1966 births
Living people
South African cricketers
Border cricketers
Free State cricketers
Gauteng cricketers
Place of birth missing (living people)